Akeli is a 2015 Pakistani romantic drama serial. It is based on the novel of Nuzhat Saman airing on Hum TV. The series is directed by Nain Maniar and Osama Ahmad Siddiqi and produced by Ironline Productions. The soap aired Monday to Friday evenings. It ended on 5 November 2015.

Cast
Iqra Qureshi as Mahnoor
 Imran Aslam as Faizaan
Diya Mughal as Fakhra
 Shamil Khan as Azfar
 Naveed Raza as Asif
Faria Sheikh as Sidra
Sadia Ghaffar
Parveen Akbar as Sidra and Sawera's mother
Gul-e-Rana as Faizan's mother
Madiha Rizvi /Naheed Shabbir (from ep 60 to 75) as Shahnaz

References

External links
 Official Hum Tv Website

Hum TV original programming
Urdu-language television shows
Pakistani drama television series
2015 Pakistani television series debuts
2014 Pakistani television series endings